Leyla Şaylemez (1 January 1989, Mersin – 9 January 2013, Paris) was an area manager of the PKK youth organisation. Her nom de guerre was Ronahî. In Turkey Leyla Şöylemez had an arrest warrant issued against her on charges of "membership of a terrorist organization".

In Turkey, there was an arrest warrant in absentia for Leyla Söylemez on the charge of "membership in a terrorist organization", but Şaylemez was wanted only in Turkey.

Background

She fled to Germany in the 1990s together with her family and lived in Halle, where she studied architecture. But she did not graduate, in order to become more involved in politics. She was assassinated in Paris on 9 January 2013, along with Sakine Cansız and Fidan Doğan. She was shot in the head with a silenced weapon at the Kurdish Information Centre in Paris. Within a week of the assassination Ömer Güney was detained by the French police. After questioning him they suspected him of being involved in the murder and put him in pretrial detention. By January 21 he was the main suspect as television closed circuit images showed he was at the premises the day of the murder. In December 2016,a month before the trial would have begun, Güney died from a tumor in a hospital in Paris.

See also
List of unsolved murders

References

1989 births
2013 deaths
Assassinated activists
Assassinated Kurdish people
Assassinations in France
Deaths by firearm in France
Dicle University alumni
Female murder victims
Kurdish activists
Kurdish women activists
Members of the Kurdistan Workers' Party
People from Mersin
Turkish Kurdish people
Unsolved murders in France